Monastic examinations comprise the annual examination system used in Myanmar (Burma) to rank and qualify members of the Buddhist sangha, or community of Buddhist monks. The institution of monastic examinations first began in 1648 during pre-colonial era, and the legacy continues today, with modern-day examinations largely conducted by the Ministry of Religious Affairs's Department of Religious Affairs.

History 

The institution of monastic examinations date to the pre-colonial era. Burmese monarchs used these examinations to encourage the study of Pali, the liturgical language of Theravada Buddhism. Successful candidates were rewarded with royal recognition, titles and ranks, and monastic residences.

The pathamabyan examinations began in 1648 during the rule of King Thalun of the Taungoo Dynasty. King Bodawpaya of the Konbaung Dynasty standardized the existing set of examinations, and introduced new ones related to the Vinaya.

This system temporarily lapsed following the demise of the Konbaung Dynasty in 1886, but was revived by the colonial Directorate of Public Instruction to encourage theological and secular education in Burmese monasteries. After a few years of resistance by the Burmese sangha, the first series of colonially-administered examinations was successfully launched in June 1895. They were held annually in Mandalay, Rangoon, and Moulmein. Successful candidates were certified as pathamagyaw.

Government examinations 
Monastic examinations are divided into multiple grades, based on level of difficulty. Monks that pass each succeeding examination are eligible to sit for the next highest-level examination. Monastic exams are held during the Burmese month of Nayon. Examination content is drawn from Buddhist texts (e.g., Abhidhamma Pitaka, Vinaya, and Sutta Pitaka). Questions require candidates to replicate passages from memory, to analyze specific text, and to correct Pali grammar.

Thamanegyaw examinations 
Novice monks (sāmaṇera), who are under the age of 20 and by virtue of their age, have not yet received full ordination, are eligible to sit for thamanegyaw (သာမဏေကျော်) examinations, which are administered by the monasteries in which the novice monks reside, between the months of October and January. The overall examination has three grades, and test knowledge of Buddhist scriptures, the Vinaya, Pali grammar, and the Jataka tales. Memorization of over 5,000 pages of text is required to pass the written and oral components, and the annual pass rate is under 13%. Novice monks who pass the exam are awarded the monastic title "" (လင်္ကာရ), which is suffixed to the monk's monastic name.

Pathamabyan examinations 
The Pahtamabyan (ပထမပြန်စာမေးပွဲ) examinations, the lowest-level series of examinations, comprise three exams, from lowest to highest difficulty:

 Pathamange examination (ပထမငယ်စာမေးပွဲ)
 Pathamalat examination (ပထမလတ်စာမေးပွဲ)
 Pathamagyi examination (ပထမကြီးစာမေးပွဲ)
Candidates who rank first on the Pathamagyi examination are known as pathamagyaw.

Dhammācariya examinations 
Dhammācariya examinations (ဓမ္မာစရိယစာမေးပွဲ), the mid-level series of examinations. Candidates for these examinations are required to pass all three components of the Pathamabyan examinations. The examinations are held over the course of nine days, including six days covering the base texts, one day covering Burmese language texts, and two days for Pali language texts.

Successful candidates are bestowed the monastic title of "" (Pali for "teacher of the Dharma").

Tipiṭakadhara and Tipiṭakakovida examinations 

The Tipiṭakadhara and Tipiṭakakovida examinations (တိပိဋကဓရ တိပိဋကကောဝိဒ ရွေးချယ်ရေးစာမေးပွဲ), held since 1948, are the highest-level examinations conducted by the Burmese government. These examinations, require candidates to demonstrate rote memory and comprehension of the entire Pāli Canon and its relevant commentaries, sub-commentaries, and treatises. The oral (Tipiṭakadhara) and written (Tipiṭakakovida) components are held annually in December, over the course of 33 days at the Kaba Aye Pagoda's Mahāpāsāṇa Cave in Yangon.

The breadth of the examinations requires candidates to recite over 2.4 million words with correct pronunciation and smooth flow, and transcribe over 200 texts from memory. The examinations also require candidates to display their mastery of "doctrinal understanding, textual discrimination, taxonomic grouping and comparative philosophy of Buddhist doctrine."

The first candidate to pass the grueling examinations was  Mingun Sayadaw in 1954. His error-free performance across 16,000 pages, was rewarded by the Burmese government with the title "". As of 2020, only 15 monks have passed both the oral and written components, who are recognized by the  Burmese government as "Sāsana Azani" (from Pali). Successful candidates are bestowed ranking titles, flagstaffs, and white silken kanekgadan umbrellas (ကနက္ကဒဏ်ထီးဖြူတော်) depending on their relative performance.

Private examinations 
Two monastic organizations in Burma also conduct annual Dhammacariya examinations, including the Sakyasīha Examination (သကျသီဟ) sponsored by Mandalay's Pariyatti Sasana Association, and the Cetiyaṅgaṇa Examination (စေတိယင်္ဂဏ ပရိယတ္တိ ဓမ္မာနုဂ္ဂဟ စာလျှောက်မေးပွဲ) sponsored by the Board of Trustees of Shwedagon Pagoda. Monks who pass these examinations are bestowed a monastic title, -bhivaṃsa (ဘိဝံသ), which is suffixed to their monastic name (e.g., Ashin Nandamalabhivamsa).

These examinations, which test monks' knowledge of Buddhist scriptures and analytical thinking, are highly regarded by Buddhist laity in Myanmar, and consists of two stages, the first of which must be passed by the age of 27 and the second by the age of 35.

Successful candidates of the latter examination are bestowed the Cetiyaṅgaṇa Pariyatti Dhammācariya Gaṇavācaka (စေတိယင်္ဂဏ ပရိယတ္တိ ဓမ္မာစရိယ ဂဏဝါစက) and Cetiyaṅgaṇa Abhivaṃsa (စေတိယင်္ဂဏ အဘိဝံသ) titles. Successful candidates are qualified to sit for the government's Tipitakadhara and Tipitakavida examinations.

Monastic titles 

Candidates successfully passing the Dhammācariya and higher-level examinations are bestowed ranking titles, as listed below (in order of decreasing precedence):
  and  examination titles
  (ဓမ္မဘဏ္ဍာဂါရိက, "Keeper of the Dhamma Treasure")
  (မဟာတိပိဋကကောဝိဒ, "Great Bearer of the Tipitaka (oral and written)")
  (တိပိဋကကောဝိဒ, "Bearer of the Written Tipitaka")
  (အဘိဓမ္မကောဝိဒ)
  (တိပိဋကဓရ, "Bearer of the Spoken Tipitaka")
  (အဘိဓမ္မိက)
  (ဒီဃနိကာယကောဝိဒ)
  (ဒီဃဘာဏက)
  (ဝိနယကောဝိဒ)
  (ဝိနယဓရ)
 Dhammācariya examination titles
  (ဓမ္မာစရိယမကုဋရံသီ)
  (သာသနဓဇ သိရီပဝရဓမ္မာစရိယ)
  (သာသနဓဇဓမ္မာစရိယ)

References

See also 
 Abhidhajamahāraṭṭhaguru
 Agga Maha Pandita
 Burmese Buddhist titles
 List of Sāsana Azani recipients
 Monastic schools in Myanmar
 Pāli Canon
 Pariyatti
 Phaungdawoo Monastic Education High School
 Pirivena (Sri Lanka)
 Sanam Luang Dhamma Studies (Thailand)
 Tipiṭakadhara Dhammabhaṇḍāgārika
 Tipitakadhara Tipitakakovida Selection Examinations

Examinations
Education in Myanmar
Buddhist monasticism